The  Party for the Integral Renewal of Burundi-Intahemana (PARIBU-Intahemana)  is a small political party in Burundi.

References

Political parties in Burundi